is a 1959 Japanese horror film directed by Nobuo Nakagawa. The film is based on the kabuki play Yotsuya Kaidan. The was among the many horror films that Nakagawa adapted for Shintoho in the late 1950s and was one of the many adaptations of the play.

Plot
Ruthless samurai Iemon Tamiya wants to marry Oiwa. Iemon waits outside of the home of Oiwa's father Samon, begging him to let him marry Oiwa. He is insulted by Samon and his companion Sato. Enraged, Iemon attacks Samon and Sato, killing them. A low-ranking criminal and witness to the murder, Naosuke, who had been working for Samon, offers to keep quiet about the murders in exchange for Iemon's help. The two form a conspiracy to convince Oiwa and her sister, Sode, that their father had been murdered by known criminal Usaburo. They plan to murder Yomoschichi, the son of Sato and fiancé of Sode, so that Naosuke can marry Sode. The two attack Yomoschichi, throwing him over a large waterfall. 
 
A year later, Iemon and Oiwa are married and living in Edo (the former name of Tokyo) with their infant son. Unknown to Oiwa, her sister Sode and Naosuke are also living together in the same city. Tiring of his lack of status, as well as his marriage to Oiwa, Iemon begins to court Ume, daughter of the nobleman Ito. He and Naosuke plan to poison Oiwa so that Iemon can marry Ume and become a wealthy nobleman. Iemon recruits the masseur Takuetsu to seduce his wife, thus allowing Iemon to legally kill his wife for adultery. After failing to seduce Oiwa, Takuetsu tells her about Iemon's plan. Simultaneously, having ingested the poison, Oiwa's face breaks out in horrific boils. In a fit of madness, Oiwa attacks Takuetsu with a razor, but instead mortally wounds herself. As she dies, she swears revenge on Iemon. Iemon returns to the house and kills Takuetsu. He and Naosuke nail the two bodies to a pair of shutters and sink them in the river.
 
That same night, Iemon is wed to Ume. Soon, both Iemon and Naosuke are haunted by visions of the dead and deformed Oiwa, as well as Takuetsu. The terrified Iemon attacks the spirit at his new home at night, accidentally killing Ume as well as both of her parents. He flees to a Buddhist temple in search of sanctuary. That same night, Oiwa's ghost visits her sister Sode and Naosuke. Upon seeing her, Naosuke confesses to his crimes and flees to the same temple. The ghost of Oiwa leads Sode to the home of Yomoschichi, who had survived the attempted murder. Yomoschichi and Sode resolve to avenge their slain loved ones.
 
At the temple, Naosuke taunts Iemon, who in turn kills Naosuke. Yomoschichi and Sode arrive and attack Iemon. Driven mad by the spirits of Oiwa and Takuetsu, he is unable to defend himself and is killed. The film ends with a vision of Oiwa, her appearance restored and holding her infant son, presumably in Heaven - her spirit now able to rest in peace with her revenge complete.

Cast

Background
Director Nobuo Nakgawa directed over 100 films by the time of his death in 1984, and about eight horror films, most of which were shot between 1956 and 1960 at Shintoho studios with tight deadlines and low budgets.

Release
The Ghost of Yotsuya was released in Japan on July 11, 1959. The film was released in the United States by Shimoto Enterprises with English subtitles.

Reception
From retrospective reviews, James Marriott commented on the film in the book The Definitive Guide to Horror Movies, proclaiming of the many adaptations of the play that "Nakagawa's is the classic." noting that the visuals in the film take on a "hallucinatory quality" specifically mentioning the swamp scenes and the scenes that slide into "Jigoku styled madness"

See also
 List of horror films of the 1950s

References

Sources

External links
 
 
 
 

1959 films
1959 horror films
1950s ghost films
Japanese horror films
Japanese ghost films
Japanese supernatural horror films
Films directed by Nobuo Nakagawa
Shintoho films
1950s Japanese films